Parliamentary elections were held in Ivory Coast on 9 November 1980, with a second round on 23 November. At the time the country was a one-party state with the Democratic Party of Ivory Coast – African Democratic Rally (PDCI-RDA) as the sole legal party. Unlike previous elections in which voters approved a single list of PDCI-RDA candidates, this election saw 649 PDCI-RDA candidates contest the 147 seats (up from 120 at the previous election) on a two-round absolute majority basis. 74 candidates were elected in the first round, with the remainder requiring a second round of voting. Only 27 of the incumbent MPs retained their seats. Voter turnout was just 42.6%.

Results

References

Ivory Coast
1980 in Ivory Coast
Elections in Ivory Coast
One-party elections
November 1980 events in Africa
Election and referendum articles with incomplete results